Miller & Son is a 2019 live action short film directed by non-binary filmmaker Asher Jelinsky during their directing MFA studies at the AFI Conservatory. This short film explores the feeling of compartmentalization by portraying the life of a transgender mechanic, performed by non-binary actress Jesse James Keitel. It has been selected and awarded at several film festivals including Clermont-Ferrand International Short Film Festival, St. Louis International Film Festival where it won the Oscar Qualifying Best Live-Action Short Award, the BAFTA Student Film Awards where it won Best Live Action, and the Student Academy Awards where it won its second Oscar Qualifying Award with the Gold Medal for "Best Narrative" (Domestic).

Plot 
A trans woman mechanic lives between running her family's auto shop during the day and expressing her femininity at night, until an unforeseen event threatens the balance of her compartmentalized life.

Awards 
Since its launch, the film has received numerous awards, and selected in more than 60 festivals around the world.

References

External links 

 
 

2019 short films
2019 films
Films about trans women
2019 LGBT-related films
American LGBT-related films
2010s American films